Key Party Records was a Japanese independent record label established in 1997 by Henry Lee Euro, known as the vocalist for the band Speed-ID. The company had both a recording studio and a design studio focusing on visual kei bands of a similar style of music and dress. The Key Party label went on to sign bands like Aliene Ma'riage, Noir Fleurir and Missalina Rei.  Key Party was eventually incorporated into Enamell Records, which has since become defunct.

May 3–5, 2005, there was a three-day Key Party 2005 revival, consisting of a Q&A and two concerts in the style of the labels Hold Your Key concerts. The first concert featured a line-up of original Key Party bands; the second concert featured the current bands of members of former Key Party bands.

Signed bands

 Aliene Ma'riage
 Crow (later Kagrra) 
 Eliphas Levi
 Lar~Mia 
 Missalina Rei consisted of four members: Arisu Arisugawa, Hiro, Aya, and Kazui.  In 1999, the comedic song "Tokimeki" (ト・キ・メ・キ, December 16, 1999) was released via Enamell Records and it reached number 85 on the Oricon Single Weekly Chart. 
 Neil
 Noir Fleurir (formerly Deflower)
 Noi'x
 Rapture
 Speed-id

Label Discography

CD
Hold Your Key - Dual Shock Version Directors Cut
Hold Your Key Kagi o Nigere! 1999 (Hold Your Key 鍵を握れ! 1999) (Feb 24 1999)
Hold Your Key - Dual Shock Version 1999.5.30 Shibuya Public Hall (渋谷公会堂)
Hold Your Key 2000

Video
Hold Your Key 1999 (1999)
The End of Century ~Key Party Omnibus Live Video (Mar 23 1999)
Hold You Key 2000 (Jan 21 2000)
Key Party All Stars-Hold Your Key 05 (2005)

References

Japanese record labels
Record labels established in 1997